The 2015–16 Nemzeti Bajnokság I (known as the K&H férfi kézilabda liga for sponsorship reasons) is the 64th season of the Nemzeti Bajnokság I, Hungary's premier Handball league.

Team information 

The following 14 clubs compete in the NB I during the 2015–16 season:

Personnel and kits
Following is the list of clubs competing in 2015–16 Nemzeti Bajnokság I, with their president, head coach, kit manufacturer and shirt sponsor.

1. On the back of shirt.
2. On the shorts.
3. Additionally, referee kits are now being made by Adidas, sponsored by Provident.

Managerial changes

Regular season (Alapszakasz)

Schedule and results

Championship round (Felsőház)

Schedule and results

Relegation round (Alsóház) 
That team before the round was started, got bonus points, they received to them to bee based ranked in regular season; Sport36-Komló has got 11 bonus points, Kőnig-Trade Balmazújváros 10 bonus point, B.Braun Gyöngyös 8 points, Orosházi FKSE-LINAMAR 7 points, Ceglédi KKSE 5 points, Mezőkövesdi KC 4 points, Eger SBS Eszterházy 2 points, PLER-Budapest 1 point.

Schedule and results

Season statistics

Number of teams by counties

Hungarian clubs in European competitions
EHF Champions League

MVM Veszprém

MOL-Pick Szeged

EHF Cup

Grundfos Tatabánya KC

Csurgói KK

See also
 2015–16 Magyar Kupa
 2015–16 Nemzeti Bajnokság I/B

References

External links
 Hungarian Handball Federaration 

Nemzeti Bajnokság I (men's handball)
2015–16 domestic handball leagues
Nemzeti Bajnoksag I Men